Ḥabīb ibn Muẓāhir al-Asadī was of the Banu Asad clan, and one of the companions of Ali, Hasan ibn Ali and Husayn ibn Ali. He was one of the people of Kufa who sent letters to Husayn ibn Ali (grandson of Muhammad) and invited him to Kufa. Though, when he realized that people of Kufa have broken their allegiance to Husayn, he left Kufa, joined Husayn, and was martyred at the age of 75 while fighting in Husayn's army, in Karbala.

Battle of Karbala

Habib heavily contributed in the Battle of Karbala. He fought with the third Imam, Husayn ibn Ali against the forces of Yazid, led by Umar ibn Sa'd, killing around 62 people.

Husayn's army was split into 3 sections, the left flank, the right flank and the Ahl al-Bayt. Habib was given the duty of being in charge of the left flank of Husayn's army, despite the fact that he was old. His tomb was included in Imam Husayn Shrine and was located in the southern porch.

Habib fought like a hero and killed 62 people of the enemy. Just then, Budayl b. Maryam 'Aqfani attacked him and hit him on the head with his sword. Another enemy hit him with a spear, causing him to fall off the horse and down to the ground. Then, Budayl b. Maryam beheaded him.

See also
 Zuhayr ibn al-Qayn
 Shia Islam
 Burayr ibn Khudayr al-Hamdani

References

People killed at the Battle of Karbala
Year of birth missing
680 deaths
605 births